The SCW Television Championship was a professional wrestling championship in Steel City Wrestling (SCW). The title was a secondary championship of the SCW promotion. It was the third singles championship established in SCW, having been introduced in 1998, in the finals of an eight-man tournament.

The inaugural champion was Don Montoya, who defeated Joey Centerfold in a tournament final on October 18, 1998 to become the first SCW Television Champion. Montoya and Lou Marconi are tied for the record of most reigns, with two each. At 140 days, Montoya's second reign is the longest in the title's history. Joey Matthews' third reign was the shortest in the history of the title lasting less than a day. He had previously been awarded the champion via forfeit when then champion, The Blue Meanie, failed to appear for a scheduled title defense. Matthews was attacked by Lou Marconi during his acceptance speech and lost the title in the impromptu match; Marconi was pinned for the belt by Tom Brandi that same night. Overall, there have been 8 reigns shared between 6 wrestlers with 1 deactivation.

Title history
Key

List of combined reigns

References
General

Specific

External links
SCW Television Championship at Cagematch.net
SCW Television Championship at Wrestlingdata.com

Television wrestling championships
Steel City Wrestling